Søren Hvalsø is a Danish sailor in the Dragon class. He became World Champion in 1987 crewing for Valdemar Bandolowski.

References

Danish male sailors (sport)
Dragon class sailors
Living people
Year of birth missing (living people)
Place of birth missing (living people)